, often abbreviated as AIC is a Japanese animation studio founded on June 15, 1982 and located in Nerima, Tokyo, Japan. On December 10, 2015, AIC RIGHTS Company, Inc. was established through a company split, in which AIC Rights received the transfer of some of the copyrights owned by Anime International Company.

Their notable works include series such as Tenchi Muyo!, Bubblegum Crisis, El Hazard, and several adaptations of the manga Oh My Goddess!.

AIC had eight sub-studios within itself, named: "AIC ASTA" (2003, formerly: "AIC A.S.T.A."), "AIC Build" (2010), "AIC Classic" (2010), "AIC Digital" (1997), "AIC Frontier" (June, 2012), "AIC PLUS+" (2006), "AIC Spirits" (2003) and "AIC Takarazuka" (2006).

History

In June 2006, a partnership was started with NTU for the development of the CACANI system, a software used as a tool in the animation process to generate fills between keyframes.

In September 2010, Oizumi Corporation acquired 95% of the studio from the ACA-managed investment fund MCP Synergy for 530 million yen. Also on the same day of the acquisition, AIC will buyback the remaining shares of the company held by TM Company. Together with the 5% share buyback from AIC, the studio subsequently became a wholly owned subsidiary of Oizumi Corporation.

In March of the following year, Aplix Corporation acquired all shares of the studio except AIC's treasury stock from Oizumi Corporation for 660 million yen, and AIC became a subsidiary of the company.

In February 2013, production producers of AIC Spirits quit the company and established an animation studio Production IMS. Also in May of that year, production producers of AIC Classic quit and founded the studio, Troyca.

On January 20, 2014, Aplix IP Holdings transferred all shares of AIC to Tōru Miura at 8,000 yen (1 yen per share).

In August 2015, former AIC animator Atsushi Okuda tweeted a post stating that AIC's production department had been disbanded.

In December 2015, Yasutaka Omura was appointed as the CEO of AIC. Also in the same month, AIC RIGHTS CO., Ltd was established through a company split from AIC, in which AIC Rights received the transfer of some of the copyrights of the work of Anime International Company. Omura would be appointed as the CEO of AIC Rights.

In February 2017, AIC Rights launched the "anime reboot projects" initiative to celebrate AIC's 35th anniversary.

On January 12, 2020, Omura announced his resigning from his CEO position at Anime International Company, although he'll remain as CEO of AIC Rights. Following Omura's resignation, Tōru Miura would return as CEO of AIC.

In April 2021, AIC Rights entered into a business alliance with Toei Agency, with the two companies going forward co-owning the copyrights to some of the intellectual property owned by AIC Rights.

In February 2022, Kenji Tsukamoto was appointed as the new representative director of AIC Rights, replacing Omura.

Works

TV series

Films

OVAs

ONAs

Outsourced productions

Specials

Video games

See also
 Artmic, former Japanese studio that originally produced a lot of titles that AIC now owns.

References

External links
 Anime International Company's official website 
 AIC Rights' official website 

 
Animation studios in Tokyo
Mass media companies established in 1982
Japanese animation studios
Nerima
Japanese companies established in 1982